Kežmarok ( or ; ,) is a town in the Spiš region of eastern Slovakia (population 16,000), on the Poprad River. Prior to World War I, it was in Szepes county in the Kingdom of Hungary.

History
Settlement at Kežmarok dates back to the Upper Stone Age. In the 13th century the region contained a community of Saxons, a Slovak fishing village, a Hungarian border post and a Carpathian German settlement. Its Latin name was first mentioned in 1251 as Villa (Saxonum apud Ecclesiam) Sancte Elisabeth. In 1269 Kežmarok received its town charter. It also had the right to organize a cheese market (hence the German name Kesmark ("Käsemarkt" - "cheese market"). In 1433 the town was severely damaged by a Hussite raid. After 1440, the count of Spiš had a seat in Kežmarok. In the 15th century (and then once more in 1655), Kežmarok became a free royal town.

The town was a stronghold of the noble Thököly family. The Hungarian magnate and warrior Imre Thököly was born in the town in 1657. He died in exile in Turkey in 1705 but in the 20th century his body was returned to Kežmarok and he is buried in a noble mausoleum in the town's Lutheran church.

The town's other monuments include a castle, many Renaissance merchant houses, and a museum of ancient books. In pride of place is the Protestant church built in 1688 entirely of wood. The church also contains an organ of 1719 with wooden pipes. The church has been a UNESCO World Heritage Site since 2008.

Kežmarok had an ethnic German majority until around 1910, and Germans stayed a large minority until the end of World War II. Most Germans were evacuated to Germany or the Sudetenland before the arrival of the Red Army. The evacuation was mostly the initiative of Adalbert Wanhoff and prepared the diocese of the German Evangelical Church between mid-November 1944 and 21 January 1945. It also had a large and active Jewish community. During World War II, under the auspices of the glorious First Slovak Republic, nearly 3,000 of the town's Jews were deported to German death camps. The town's pre-war Jewish cemetery has now been restored.

Monuments
The town contains many historic monuments, including the Basilica of the Exaltation of the Holy Cross and the Wooden articular church in Kežmarok.

Demographics
According to the 2001 census, the town had 17,383 inhabitants. 95.21% of inhabitants were Slovaks, 1.59% Roma, 0.83% Czechs and 0.43% Germans. The religious makeup was 77.50% Roman Catholics, 10.98% people with no religious affiliation, 4.83% Lutherans and 2.63% Greek Catholics.

Twin towns — sister cities

Kežmarok is twinned with:

 Bochnia, Poland
 Gliwice, Poland
 Hajdúszoboszló, Hungary
 Kupiškis, Lithuania
 Lanškroun, Czech Republic
 Lesneven, France
 Nowy Targ, Poland
 Příbram, Czech Republic
 Weilburg, Germany
 Zgierz, Poland

Notable people

 Vojtech Alexander (1857–1916), radiologist
 Tibor Gašpar (born 1962) the President of police of Slovakia, 2012-2018
 Samuel Genersich (1768–1844) a Carpathian German physician and botanist.
 Frigyes Ákos Hazslinszky (1818–1896) a Hungarian mycologist and botanist.
 Juraj Herz (1934–2018), a Slovak film director and actor
 Baron Paul Kray of Krajova and Topolya (1735–1804), a soldier and general in Habsburg service.
 Milan Lach (born 1973) a Slovak bishop of Rusyn ethnicity; the current bishop of the Ruthenian Catholic Eparchy of Parma
 Olbracht Łaski (died 1604) a Polish nobleman, an alchemist and courtier
 Thomas Mauksch (1749–1832) a Carpathian German naturalist, botanist and wine merchant.
 Karl Sovanka (1893–1961), painter and sculptor
 Emeric Thököly (1657–1705), a Hungarian nobleman, Prince of Transylvania.

Sport 

 Ľuboš Bartečko (born 1976), former ice hockey player
 Jana Gantnerová-Šoltýsová (born 1959) a Slovak former alpine skier who competed for Czechoslovakia in the 1876, 1980, and 1984 Winter Olympics.
 Karol Itauma, (born 2000) professional boxer
 Ladislav Škantár (born 1983) & Peter Škantár (born 1982) retired Slovak slalom canoeists, joint gold medallist at the 2016 Summer Olympics
 Natália Šubrtová (born 1989) Slovak alpine skier, sighted guide and eleven-time Paralympic Champion.
 Radoslav Suchy (born 1976), ice hockey player
 Adam Žampa (born 1990) & Andreas Žampa (born 1993) Slovakian Olympic alpine ski racers.

Gallery

See also
 List of municipalities and towns in Slovakia

References
Notes

External links

 http://www.kezmarok.com
 

Cities and towns in Slovakia
Spiš
Holocaust locations in Czechoslovakia